"Diva" is a song by Australian rapper the Kid Laroi featuring American rapper Lil Tecca. It was released on 31 January 2020 and peaked at number 76 on the ARIA charts. The song has been certified gold in Australia and platinum in the United States.

Charts

Certifications

References

2019 songs
2020 singles
The Kid Laroi songs
Lil Tecca songs
Songs written by the Kid Laroi
Columbia Records singles
Sony Music singles